The 1930 Southern Illinois Maroons football team was an American football team that represented Southern Illinois Normal University (now known as Southern Illinois University Carbondale) in the Illinois Intercollegiate Athletic Conference (IIAC) during the 1930 college football season.  In its 14th season under head coach William McAndrew, the team compiled a 9–0 record.

Schedule

References

Southern Illinois
Southern Illinois Salukis football seasons
Interstate Intercollegiate Athletic Conference football champion seasons
College football undefeated seasons
Southern Illinois Maroons football